Lucy Leuchars (died 1847), was an English case manufacturer and entrepreneur.

Leuchars was married to James Leuchars, who founded a dressing case company in Piccadilly in London in 1794. When she was widowed in 1822, she took over the company under the name L. Leuchars.

In 1837, Leuchars received a royal warrant to Queen Victoria, and she received the title "Case Manufacturer" to the queen. In 1841, her son William Leuchars became her business partner. the name of the firm changing to Lucy Leuchars & Son.

References 

19th-century English businesswomen
1847 deaths
19th-century English businesspeople
British furniture designers
Queen Victoria